Abu al-Misk Kafur (905–968), also called al-Laithi, al-Suri, al-Labi was a dominant personality of Ikhshidid Egypt and Syria. Originally a black slave, probably from Nubia, he was made vizier of Egypt, becoming its de facto ruler from 946 after the death of his master, Muhammad bin Tughj. Thereafter, he ruled the Ikshidid domains—Egypt and southern Syria (including Damascus)—until his death in 968.

Biography
Abu al-Misk Kafur, whose name means "musky camphor", is described by the sources variously as coming from Abyssinia (Ethiopia), the Bilad al-Sudan (Land of the Blacks) or Nubia, the latter being the most probable. Muhammad ibn Tughj, the founder of the Ikhshidid dynasty of Egypt, purchased him as a slave in 923. He is recorded as having a dark complexion and being a eunuch. Recognising the slave's intelligence and talent, Ibn Tughj freed him. The story goes that Kafur was freed because he kept his eyes fastened upon his master, while others kept their eyes on the master's gifts. Thus, historian Philip Hitti noted, Kafur would be generously rewarded for such loyalty.

Ibn Tughj appointed Kafur to be the supervisor of princely education for his two sons. The Egyptian ruler then promoted Kafur as a military officer. As a field commander Kafur conducted a military mission to Syria in 945. He was put in charge of some campaigns in the Hejaz. Kafur was involved in some diplomatic exchanges between the Ikhshidids and the caliph of Baghdad.

Kafur became the de facto ruler of Egypt in 946 (since Kafur was the guardian of bin Tughj's sons, he ruled in their stead upon the death of their father). Though subsequent historians have portrayed him as a just and moderate ruler, he owes a great deal of his fame to the scathing satirical poems directed against him by al-Mutanabbi, a medieval Arab poet.

Kafur died in April 968, and was buried in Jerusalem next to the Ikhshidid emirs, at a location close to the Gate of the Tribes on the Temple Mount.

Status as former slave
Kafur's status as a former slave did not hinder him from rising to power under the Ikhshidids. It was customary for mamluks (that is, former slaves) to enter the military organization and even reach high positions in it, and many Africans such as Kafur were employed in various occupations and maintained a cohesive culture interacting with that of their hosts. Kafur's rise to power, from being an African slave to the ruler of Egypt and parts of Syria, is one of the earliest examples in Islamic history of a sovereign with the lowliest of origins.

Policies

Domestic politics
While Kafur held de facto control over Egypt, he operated behind the façade of Ikhshdid rulers. On his deathbed, Ibn Tughj had appointed Kafur as guardian over his two sons. In 946, Kafur helped the elder son, Anūdjūr, secure the succession to Ibn Tughj. And in 961, he helped ʿAlī ibn al-Ikhshīd, Anūdjūr's younger brother, secure the Egyptian throne. Only in 966, following the death of ʿAlī, did Kāfūr publicly declare himself as the sole master of Egypt.

Kafur, despite the tremendous pressure placed upon him, maintained stability inside Egypt. During 947 and 948, he fought and put down the rebellion by Ghalbūn. In 954 he successfully averted an abortive coup d'état by Anūdjūr. He also survived the spread of subversive Ismāʿīlī propaganda against him. His ability to resolve internal political complications is considered as having significantly prolonged the lifespan of the Ikhshidids.

Foreign politics
One of Abu al-Misk Kafur's greatest achievements was his successful protection of the Ikhshidid establishment from the Hamdanids (in Syria), Fatimids (in northern Africa, to the west of Egypt), Qarmatians (in the Arabian peninsula), and the Nubians (from south of Egypt).

Earlier Kafur's master, Muhammad ibn Tughj, trusted him to handle the military campaigns of Syria and Hejaz (in the Arabian peninsula). His military and diplomatic measures secured Damascus for the Ikhshidids (from the Hamdanids) in 947. Sayf al-Dawla, governor of Aleppo, had tried to overrun Syria, but his efforts were frustrated by Kafur, and the former recognized the latter's lordship over parts of Syria.

He was also able to delay the Fatimid expansion into Egypt, frustrating the efforts of the latter's agents. So long as Kafur was alive, the Ikhshidid establishment kept the Fatimids at bay; upon his death, the Fatimids took over.

Economy
Kafur generally maintained economic stability in Egypt, despite serious setbacks:
a fire devastated the business section of Fustat in 954;
a major earthquake rocked Egypt in 955 or early 956;
recurrence of food-price inflation (sometimes resulting in famine), and consequent civil disturbances, in 949, 952, 955, and 963–968.

Excepting the heavy government expenditure, Kafur's administration refrained from extortionate fiscal practices. His gold coinage displayed remarkable stability, though it did fluctuate. Kafur also enrolled the services of competent administrators and merchants, such as Yaqub ibn Killis, contributing to his economic accomplishments.

Patronage of the arts

Abu al-Misk Kafur gained popularity by being the patron of scholars and writers. Perhaps the most celebrated patronage, according to A.S. Ehrenkreutz, was that of the poet al-Mutanabbi. In return al-Mutanabbi praised the former slave. However, after Kafur's failure to reward him with the high office to which he aspired, al-Mutanabbi ridiculed Kafur. Thus Kafur was immortalised in the poetry of al-Mutanabbi, who was the greatest poet of Kafur's time, according to Philip Hitti.

As he was a pious man, Kafur was more comfortable with the ulema (Muslim scholarly establishment) than the poets. He surrounded himself with religious men, some of whom he showered with gifts. He constructed two mosques in Giza and on al-Muqattam and a hospital. Nevertheless, he still clung to superstitions, abandoning a home once, believing it to be under a jinn.

Kafur also maintained a magnificent and luxurious court. This, however, at times of famine, accorded poorly with the general population. In addition to the mosques and the hospital, Kafur constructed a number of sumptuous palaces, and the Kāfūriyya gardens in his capital. No archaeological remains of his contributions have been found thus far.

See also
Slavery in Islam
List of rulers of Egypt
History of Egypt

References

Sources
 
 

 

Ikhshidid emirs
Ethiopian slaves
905 births
968 deaths
Eunuchs
Viziers
10th-century rulers in Asia
10th-century rulers in Africa
Ikhshidid officials
Ikhshidid military leaders
Medieval slaves
Slaves from the Abbasid Caliphate
Egyptian slaves